This is a list of the National Register of Historic Places listings in Parmer County, Texas.

This is intended to be a complete list of properties and districts listed on the National Register of Historic Places in Parmer County, Texas. There si one individual properties listed on the National Register in the county.

Current listings

The locations of National Register properties and districts may be seen in a mapping service provided.

|}

See also

National Register of Historic Places listings in Texas
Recorded Texas Historic Landmarks in Parmer County

References

External links

Parmer County, Texas
Parmer County
Buildings and structures in Parmer County, Texas